Rahman Shah bin Marajeh (born 10 July 1996) sometimes spelled Rahmanshah Marajeh is a Malaysian professional footballer who plays as a forward for Thai League 1 club Nakhon Ratchasima

References

External links

1996 births
Living people
Malaysian footballers
People from Sabah
Sabah F.C. (Malaysia) players
Association football forwards
Malaysia Super League players